Llewellyn John Evans (born 19 February 1881) was a rugby union player who represented Australia.

Evans, a fly-half, was born in Brisbane, Queensland, and won three international rugby caps for Australia, his first against New Zealand, at Sydney, on 15 August 1903.

His brother, Poley Evans, also represented Australia in the inaugural Test match of 1899.

References

Australian rugby union players
Australia international rugby union players
1881 births
Year of death missing
Rugby union players from Brisbane
Rugby union fly-halves